Orthognathus is a genus of snout and bark beetles in the family Dryophthoridae. There are about seven described species in Orthognathus.

Species
These seven species belong to the genus Orthognathus:
 Orthognathus albofuscus Blanchard, 1846
 Orthognathus coelomerus Csiki & E., 1936
 Orthognathus dejeanii Buquet, 1837
 Orthognathus guyanensis Rheinheimer, 2015
 Orthognathus imaginis Vaurie, 1970
 Orthognathus lividus Gyllenhal, 1838
 Orthognathus subparallelus (Chevrolat, 1880)

References

Further reading

 
 

Dryophthorinae
Articles created by Qbugbot